Pilgrim Hill may refer to:
Pilgrim Hill (film), a 2013 Irish film
Pilgrim Hill (Central Park), a hill in New York City
A hostel in Lucaston, Tasmania

See also
Hurricane at Pilgrim Hill, film